Jacob John Greaves (born 12 September 2000) is an English professional footballer who plays as a centre back for Hull City. He is the son of former Hull City and York City defender Mark Greaves.

Career 
On 8 August 2019, Greaves signed a 3-year contract extension and joined Cheltenham Town on loan until January 2020. He made his league debut in a 0–0 draw against Morecambe playing the full 90 minutes.

Greaves' loan at Cheltenham was extended until the end of the season on 8 January 2020.

Greaves made his first senior team appearance for Hull City in the EFL Trophy match on 8 September 2020 against Leicester City U21.
On 17 October 2020, Greaves made his league debut in a 0–3 win away to Rochdale.

On 12 November 2020, Greaves signed a new three-year contract with the club.

On 20 February 2021 Greaves thought he had scored his first goal for Hull City in a 3–3 away draw against Doncaster Rovers only for the Dubious Goals Committee to award the final touch to Josh Magennis.

Greaves scored his first career goal on 22 October 2022 on his 101st league appearance for Hull putting his side 1–0 up away at Rotherham United.

Career statistics

Honours 
Hull City

 EFL League One Champions: 2020–21 EFL League One

References 

2000 births
Living people
English footballers
Association football central defenders
Hull City A.F.C. players
Cheltenham Town F.C. players
English Football League players
People from Cottingham, East Riding of Yorkshire